Jelle Quirinus Goes (born 26 March 1970 in Hilversum) is a Dutch football manager.

Trivia 
Goes was manager of the Estonia national football team from 2 October 2004 to 29 June 2007, before that he was assistant coach under Arno Pijpers of the same team. He worked from 1996 to 2001 for the Royal Dutch Football Association and coached U-14, U-15 and U-23. In 2001, he coached the U-21 from Estonia and was director for the U-16 & U-20.

He was a director of the school of the PFC CSKA Moscow from 2007 to 2010. Since 2010, he worked for PSV Eindhoven as a Youth Academy director. In October 2012 he signed with  FC Anzhi Makhachkala as a sporting director. On March 8, 2021 he signed as the sports director for Israeli youth teams.

References

External links
Biography in Estonian language

1970 births
Living people
Dutch football managers
Sportspeople from Hilversum
Estonia national football team managers
Dutch expatriate football managers
Expatriate football managers in Estonia
Dutch footballers
Association football midfielders
Recipients of the Order of the Cross of Terra Mariana, 4th Class
Footballers from North Holland